David Martin Shoebridge (born 17 September 1971) is an Australian politician and former barrister. He is a member of the Australian Greens and was elected to the Senate as the party's lead candidate in New South Wales at the 2022 federal election, to a term beginning on 1 July 2022. He previously served in the New South Wales Legislative Council from 2010 to 2022 and on the Woollahra Municipal Council from 2004 to 2012.

Early life and career
Shoebridge was born in Sydney. He attended James Ruse Agricultural High School, before receiving a combined Bachelor of Arts (in 1993) and a Bachelor of Laws (Hons) (in 1995) at the University of Sydney. Shoebridge was admitted as a lawyer in 1998, and was admitted to the NSW Bar in 2003.

Shoebridge started his professional career as an associate to Justice Eric Baker of the Family Court of Australia (from March 1996 to March 1998).

Before entering parliament, Shoebridge worked as a lawyer for 13 years, the majority of this time as a barrister with a focus on personal injury law, employment, discrimination and tort law.

Political career

Council politics
Shoebridge was elected to Woollahra Municipal Council in 2004 and reelected in 2008. After unsuccessfully running for the position of Deputy Mayor in April 2004 after his election, he served one term as Deputy Mayor of Woollahra from September 2004 to September 2005 under independent mayor, Geoffrey Rundle. He was an executive of the Local Government Association from 2008 to 2010 and an executive of the Holdsworth Community Centre in Woollahra from 2004 to 2008.

He was Convenor of the Greens NSW from August 2008 to August 2010. He was the Greens candidate for the state seat of Vaucluse in the 2007 state election.

State politics
He became a member of the Legislative Council in September 2010 after Sylvia Hale resigned from the Legislative Council. He was elected as a member of the Legislative Council at the 2011 state election after being preselected to the first position on the Greens' ticket.

Shoebridge was the Chair of NSW Parliament's Public Accountability Committee, the Deputy Chair of the Portfolio Committee No. 5 - Legal Affairs, the Deputy Chair of the Select Committee on the High Level of First Nations People in Custody and Oversight and Review of Deaths in Custody, the Deputy Chair of the Select Committee on the Government's management of the Powerhouse Museum and other museums and cultural projects in New South Wales, a member of the Committee on Children and Young People, a member of the Portfolio Committee No. 3 - Education, a member of the Standing Committee on Law and Justice, a member of the Selection of Bills Committee and a member of the Select Committee on the impact of technological and other change on the future of work and workers in New South Wales.

Shoebridge has worked with victims of child sexual abuse. In September 2012 at a public meeting in Newcastle, Shoebridge joined journalist Joanne McCarthy and police whistleblower Peter Fox to call for a Royal Commission into sexual abuse by the Catholic Church and other institutions. A Royal Commission into Institutional Responses to Child Sexual Abuse was established in January 2013. Shoebridge has also introduced legislation in Parliament to overturn the Ellis defence, remove the statute of limitations and reform sentencing procedures related to child sex abuse.

On 2 June 2011, Shoebridge took the record for the longest speech in the NSW Legislative Council - while talking continuously for over five hours and 58 minutes against NSW government legislation that affected public sector wages and conditions. In 2012, Shoebridge advocated against proposed changes to workers' rights - as the NSW government made changes to the workers compensation system. Accompanied by the first general strike by fire-fighters since 1956, Shoebridge helped secure amendments to the legislation meaning that fire-fighters and paramedics retained the same cover as police officers.

Shoebridge campaigned successfully in July 2013 for the abolition of the Game Council NSW by the NSW government. This followed the findings and recommendations of the Dunn Report into the Game Council's governance, called after senior Game Council figures were suspended after allegations of illegal hunting.

In November 2013, Shoebridge moved the motion that established a Parliamentary Inquiry into the Bowraville murders. In November 2014 a unanimous report was handed down which made 15 recommendations including that the NSW Police Force reviews its processes, procedures and training programs that relate to Aboriginal people and that the NSW government reviews a relevant section of the Crimes (Appeal and Review) Act 2001. In May 2016, the then NSW Attorney-General sent an application for a retrial to the Court of Criminal Appeal. In November 2017 the Court of Criminal Appeal held four hearings into the case, and decided in 2018 against a retrial.

Shoebridge worked closely with community groups such as the Better Planning Network to force the then O'Farrell government to withdraw its planning reforms in November 2013.

In 2015, the Chinese consulate of Sydney warned members of parliament to not attend Shoebridge's briefing on human rights abuses in China's organ trade. In 2016, Shoebridge introduced a bill outlawing organ trade in New South Wales.

Starting in 2015 Shoebridge campaigned with community groups, residents and councillors across NSW against forced council amalgamations by the NSW Coalition government. Woollahra Council was a leader in the litigation against the NSW government - with the High Court granting it leave to appeal. In February 2017 the campaign had a major success with the Berejiklian government abandoning all pending forced amalgamations in the regions. In July 2017 the government backed down again abandoning all remaining council amalgamations in Sydney.

Shoebridge has campaigned on police accountability. In 2014, as part of a broader campaign to curb the use of police drug dogs, Shoebridge launched Facebook page Sniff Off with individuals reporting drug dog locations at train stations, festivals and other public places in NSW. Through freedom of information and questions in Parliament Shoebridge obtained data that indicates drug dogs get it wrong up to 80% of the time.

In 2017, Shoebridge, alongside Lee Rhiannon, defended the establishment of the anti-capitalist Left Renewal faction in the NSW Greens. Former Left Renewal activists allege the organisation sought to support the offices of Shoebridge and Rhiannon, although they were both not members of the organisation. Tom Raue, one of Shoebridge’s staffers, urged Greens' members to join Left Renewal, saying "our founding document explicitly mentions the anarchists and socialists that make up the party".

On 12 April 2018, Shoebridge successfully moved the motion in the NSW parliament to force the government to release its business case for the relocation of the Powerhouse Museum from Ultimo. In so doing, Shoebridge secured the support of MPs from Labor and other parties, as well as one Liberal MP.

On 15 May 2018, Shoebridge spoke at a pro-Palestinian rally, following the alleged deaths of possibly up to 60 Palestinians (according to Palestinian sources) during the 2018 Gaza border riots.

In June 2020 a part-time member of Shoebridge's staff, Xiaoran Shi, was charged with defacing a statue of James Cook in Hyde Park, Sydney outside of work hours. Shoebridge declared he would not sack the staffer due to the actions being taken outside of work hours, and he was censured by the NSW Upper House for failing to condemn the act. Shoebridge condemned the public criticism on his staffer.

In 2020/2021, Shoebridge chaired a parliamentary inquiry to scrutinise the NSW government's grants under the Stronger Communities Grants Fund (in relation to which a senior member of Berejiklian's staff revealed to the inquiry that she most likely shredded and deleted documents relating to the Premier's approval of grants) as well as grants under the Bushfire Relief Fund (under the first round of which Blue Mountains received zero dollars).

Federal politics
In March 2021, Shoebridge won preselection as the lead candidate on the Green's Senate ticket in New South Wales at the 2022 federal election. He resigned from the Legislative Council on 11 April 2022 prior to the close of nominations for the federal election. He was subsequently elected to a six-year Senate term beginning on 1 July 2022. At a Greens party room meeting on 16 June 2022, leader Adam Bandt announced the portfolio allocations, where Shoebridge was given three portfolios: Justice, Defence and Veteran's Affairs, and Digital Rights.

Political positions
Shoebridge is widely seen as a member of the left-wing faction of the Greens, and is an ally of former Senator Lee Rhiannon.

Personal life
Shoebridge lives in the Sydney suburb of Woollahra. He has two daughters with his partner Patricia. He founded the Greens Bushwalking Club (with the assistance of the National Parks Association).

References

1971 births
Living people
Australian Greens members of the Parliament of New South Wales
Australian Greens members of the Parliament of Australia
Members of the New South Wales Legislative Council
Members of the Australian Senate
Members of the Australian Senate for New South Wales
21st-century Australian politicians
Municipality of Woollahra
Deputy mayors of places in Australia